Eckhard Martens (born 12 June 1951 in Bützow, Mecklenburg-Vorpommern) is a German rower. He competed for the SC Dynamo Berlin / Sportvereinigung (SV) Dynamo and won medals at international rowing competitions.

References

External links
 

1951 births
Living people
People from Bützow
East German male rowers
Sportspeople from Mecklenburg-Western Pomerania
Olympic rowers of East Germany
Rowers at the 1972 Summer Olympics
Olympic medalists in rowing
World Rowing Championships medalists for East Germany
Medalists at the 1972 Summer Olympics
Olympic gold medalists for East Germany
Recipients of the Patriotic Order of Merit in bronze
European Rowing Championships medalists